Wang Ji (1197–1262) was a Goryeo Royal Prince as the first and oldest son of King Huijong and Queen Seongpyeong who got exiled to Inju following his father who forced to abdicated the throne by Choe Chung-heon, which he then famous for being The Deposed Crown Prince.

Life
Wang Ji was born in 1197 as the first child and son of Wang Yeong, from his wife, Lady Im, making him became the eldest grandson to King Sinjong and Queen Seonjeong. He had four younger brothers and five sisters, which the first sister became the wife of the future King Gojong.

When King Myeongjong exiled by the Goryeo military regime, Wang Tak, as his younger brother, succeeded the throne instead of his only son, Crown Prince Wang O. However, Wang Tak suddenly died in 1204 and his eldest son, Wang Yeong succeeded the throne. As a monarch's eldest son, the Heir Successor (원자, 元子) Wang Ji became the crown prince at the age 8 in 1204 and did the Guan Li seven years later in 1211.

However, the powerful Choe Chung-heon (최충헌) expelled King Huijong from the throne and sent him into exile at Ganghwa Island in the same year after Choe discovered that Huijong attempted to kill him in a conspiracy along with his eunuch, Wang Jun-myeong (왕준명) and others. Thus, Wang Ji was exiled to Inju and the former-crown-prince Wang O ascended the throne as King Gangjong in 1212.

After suffered throughout of his life and being pardoned, Wang Ji became Marquess Changwon (창원후, 昌原侯) and Duke Changwon (창원공, 昌原公) while later died unmarried at the age 66 in 1262 (3rd years reign of King Wonjong). There was no records left about where is his death place or tomb location.

References

Wang Ji on Encykorea .
Wang Ji on Doosan Encyclopedia .
Wang Ji on Goryeosa .

Korean princes
12th-century Korean people
1197 births
1262 deaths
13th-century Korean people